Wortendyke may refer to:

Wortendyke, New Jersey, United States, an unincorporated community in Midland Park, New Jersey
Wortendyke (NYS&W station), Midland Park, New Jersey
Wortendyke Barn, a historic barn in Park Ridge, New Jersey
Frederick Wortendyke House (Park Ridge, New Jersey), a historic house
Frederick Wortendyke House (Woodcliff Lake, New Jersey), a historic house
Wortendyke-Demund House, a historic house in Midland Park, New Jersey

People with the surname
Jacob R. Wortendyke (1818–1880), American politician
Reynier Jacob Wortendyke, Jr. (1895–1975), American judge